This was the first edition of the tournament.

Ivan and Matej Sabanov won the title after defeating Evan King and Mitchell Krueger 6–1, 3–6, [12–10] in the final.

Seeds

Draw

References

External links
 Main draw

Texas Tennis Classic - Doubles